Live at the Ventura Theater is a live music DVD by the band Something Corporate. It was recorded on May 20, 2004 at the Ventura Theater in Ventura, California after the release of their third album North and included songs from all three of their albums, including their label debut Leaving Through the Window and their independently released debut Ready... Break. This was the last release by the band before their hiatus, brought on primarily due to lead singer Andrew McMahon's side project Jack's Mannequin, as well as his subsequent diagnosis with acute lymphoblastic leukemia.

Track listing

Concert
 Hurricane - 4:25 
 21 And Invincible - 3:12 
 As You Sleep - 3:22 
 I Woke Up In A Car - 4:50 
 If I Die - 4:50 
 Me And The Moon - 4:01 
 Drunk Girl - 5:02  
 Only Ashes - 3:43 
 Ruthless - 3:52 
 Fall - 4:15 
 Down - 3:45 
 Wait - 4:28 
 Walking By - 4:50 
 Konstantine - 9:37 
 Space - 6:24 
 If U C Jordan - 2:20 
 Punk Rock Princess - 7:14

Bonus Features
 Behind The Scenes - Making Of Live At Ventura Theater - 20:00  
 Hurricane - Photo Gallery - 4:25

Personnel
Andrew McMahon - Vocals, Piano
Josh Partington - Guitar
Brian Ireland - Drums
Kevin "Clutch" Page - Bass
Robert "Raw" Anderson - Vocals, Guitar, Keys
Meiert Avis - Director
Oualid Mouaness - Producer
Bronwen LaGrue - Executive Producer
Christopher Buckley - Executive Producer
Randi Wilens - Executive Producer
Jordan Schur - Executive Producer
Carl Stubner - Executive Producer
Rick Canny - Executive Producer
Ken Mowe - Editor

Something Corporate albums